Tano Jōdai  (July 3, 1886 – April 8, 1982) was a professor of English literature, peace activist, and the sixth president of the Japan Women's University.

Career 
Jōdai was born on July 3, 1886. Her father was the head of Harue village in Shimane Prefecture, Japan. After graduating from the Shimane Prefectural Matsue Kita High School, she returned to her village and taught at the local school for a while, but then continued her studies at the Japan Women's University. She graduated with a degree in English literature. Jōdai wanted to continue her studies at the Tokyo Imperial University, but they did not accept female students at that time. Instead, a professor there named Nitobe Inazo got her a place at the Wells College in the United States, after she wrote to him about her desire to study abroad.

When Jōdai returned to Japan in 1917, she became a professor at the Japan Women's University, and was the first person to teach courses on American literature and history in Japan. Nitobe's influence led her to found the Japanese Women's Peace Association. This later became the Japanese chapter of the Women's International League for Peace and Freedom. At Nitobe's recommendation, in 1924 Jōdai studied at the University of Michigan and Newnham College, Cambridge, then stayed at his home in Geneva until 1927.

After World War II, Jōdai resumed teaching at the Japan Women's University. In 1955 she was one of the founding members of the Committee of Seven to Appeal for World Peace. From 1956 until March 1965, Jōdai served as the president of the Japan Women's University. During her tenure as president she made all of the library's collection open stacks and started a friends of the library group.

Jōdai died on April 8, 1982.

See also
 List of peace activists

Selected bibliography

Edited

Further reading

References

External links 

 Committee of Seven to Appeal for World Peace

1982 deaths
1886 births
People from Shimane Prefecture
Japanese activists
Pages with unreviewed translations
Presidents of universities and colleges in Japan
Japan Women's University alumni
Academic staff of Japan Women's University